Kulibo is a small wooden motorized traditional fishing boat with short double outriggers used by Tausug, Sama-Bajau, and Yakan people of the Philippines.

See also
Bangka (boat)
Jungkung
 Lepa
 Vinta
 Djenging
 Garay (ship)
 Balangay

References 

Indigenous ships of the Philippines